Negukthlik River is a river located in Alaska.  Its mouth touches Togiak Bay.

Rivers of Dillingham Census Area, Alaska
Rivers of Alaska
Rivers of Unorganized Borough, Alaska